The Bucher Bridge, located off U.S. Route 77 near the town of Rock in Cowley County, Kansas, was listed on the National Register of Historic Places in 1985.

Also known as Eight Mile Creek Bridge, the bridge crosses Eight Mile Creek. It was completed in 1905 by Walter Sharp of El Dorado and constructed of solid concrete. It is a concrete arch bridge, and is possibly reinforced by steel. It has short limestone wing walls.

It is possibly just the second bridge of this type built by Walter Sharp, who was experimenting.  The township did not complete the approaches to the bridge, so people in the area who would use the bridge got together and built the approaches.

References

Bridges on the National Register of Historic Places in Kansas
Bridges completed in 1905
Cowley County, Kansas
Bridges in Kansas
Arch bridges in the United States
1905 establishments in Kansas